Zhang Zhenqiang (Chinese: 张振强; Pinyin: Zhāng Zhènqiáng; born 28 January 1993) is a Chinese football player who currently plays for Chinese Super League side Wuhan FC.

Club career
Zhang Zhenqiang started his professional football career in 2011 when he was promoted to Chinese Super League side Dalian Shide's first team squad. He was loaned to Shanghai Shenxin in 2012 and played in the reserve team. When he returned Dalian Shide would be dissolved and merged with fellow Super League side Dalian Aerbin for the 2013 Chinese Super League campaign.

Zhang transferred to Chinese Super League side Liaoning Whowin in February 2016. On 18 September 2016, he made his senior debut in a 6–2 away defeat against Guangzhou Evergrande. He would unfortunately be part of the squad that was relegated at the end of the 2017 Chinese Super League campaign. 

On 7 July 2020 he would transfer to newly promoted top tier club Shijiazhuang Ever Bright. He would make his debut on 19 September 2020 in a Chinese FA Cup game against Tianjin TEDA F.C. that ended in a 2-0 defeat.

Career statistics 
.

References

External links
 

1993 births
Living people
Chinese footballers
Association football goalkeepers
Footballers from Dalian
Dalian Shide F.C. players
Dalian Professional F.C. players
Liaoning F.C. players
Cangzhou Mighty Lions F.C. players
Chinese Super League players
China League One players